The 1993 FIS Freestyle World Ski Championships were held between March 11 and March 14 at the Altenmarkt ski resort in Austria. The World Championships featured both men's and women's events in the Moguls, Aerials, Acro Skiing and the Combined.

Results

Men's results

Moguls

Aerials

Acro Skiing

Combined

Women's results

Moguls

Aerials

Acro Skiing

Combined

References

External links
 FIS Freestyle Skiing Home
 Results from the FIS

1993
1993 in Austrian sport
1993 in freestyle skiing
Radstadt Tauern
Freestyle skiing competitions in Austria